Enrique "Quique" Álvarez Costas (born 16 January 1947) is a Spanish retired football defender and coach.

He played 229 La Liga matches over the course of 11 seasons (nine goals), in representation of Celta and Barcelona.

Costas began a lengthy managerial career in the late 80s, mainly being in charge of Barcelona B.

Club career
Born in Vigo, Galicia, Costas began his professional career with local RC Celta de Vigo in 1965. He played 26 Segunda División games in his first season, including both legs of the La Liga playoff promotion against CE Sabadell FC.

After solid performances in the 1970–71 campaign, Costas moved to league powerhouse FC Barcelona after 183 competitive appearances. Almost never an undisputed starter he was still used regularly, and helped the Catalans to the 1979 conquest of the UEFA Cup Winners' Cup in his penultimate year.

Costas took up coaching afterwards, eventually managing Barcelona's B side on three occasions. On one of them he coincided with his son Quique Álvarez, a La Masia youth product and also a defender, who went on to play with success for Villarreal CF; he had another son, Óscar, who occupied the same position and competed mainly in the second and third tiers.

International career
Costas earned 13 caps for Spain over a five-year period. His debut came on 11 February 1970, in a 2–0 friendly win over West Germany (90 minutes played).

Costas was not selected, however, for any major international tournament, as the country did not manage to reach any during that timeframe.

Honours
Barcelona
La Liga: 1973–74
Copa del Rey: 1977–78
UEFA Cup Winners' Cup: 1978–79
Inter-Cities Fairs Cup: 1971

References

External links

FC Barcelona profile

1947 births
Living people
Spanish footballers
Footballers from Vigo
Association football defenders
La Liga players
Segunda División players
RC Celta de Vigo players
FC Barcelona players
Spain amateur international footballers
Spain international footballers
Catalonia international guest footballers
Spanish football managers
Segunda División managers
Segunda División B managers
FC Barcelona Atlètic managers